Miodrag Popović (1920-2005) was a Yugoslav and Serbian historian.

Works

Monographies 

Vuk Stefanović Karadžić 1787-1864, 1964
Istorija srpske književnosti – romantizam I – III, 1968 — 1972
Romantizam I – III, drugo skraćeno i prerađeno izdanje, Nolit, Beograd, 1975,
Istorija srpske književnosti – romantizam I i II, 1985

References 

1920 births
2005 deaths
20th-century Serbian historians
Yugoslav historians